Kilis is a city in south-central Turkey, near the border with Syria, and the administrative centre of Kilis Province.

On 6 February 2023 Kilis was badly affected by the twin Turkey-Syria earthquakes.

History

Although there aren't any definite information related to its foundation, today's Kilis mainly developed and became urbanized during the Ottoman period. However, traces of important cities found in the near surroundings of Kilis and the historical documents prove that important centres were always present here in every period. In the tablets belonging to the Assyrian period, the name 'Ki-li-zi' is written in cuneiform and a city named as "Ciliza Sive Urnagiganti" during the Roman Empire period is mentioned.

In addition to centers such as Kirus antique city, Oylum Höyük, Ravanda Castle, Ilezi and Tarzime Han, many other residential areas starting from the Neolithic period have also been discovered in the surrounding of Kilis as a result of archaeological surface explorations. Hittite, Greek, Persian, Roman, Byzantine, Crusader, Mamluk and Ottoman periods were experienced in the region respectively.

As a result of the researchers, it has been determined that the 2 oldest structures (Ulu Mosque, 1388 and Katrancı Mosque, 1460) in the city center of Kilis belong to the Mamluk Period. Besides these two mosques approximately 135 monumental structures have being constructed since 1516 during the Ottoman Period.

The population of Kilis was 20.000 and it was a city in which production, commerce and cultural functions were developed at the end of the 19th century and it was also a center in which agricultural products (such as grapes, cereals etc.) cultivated in nearly 500 villages around it was processed and industrial products were produced and marketed.

As in the whole Ottoman geography, members of the three major religions are living here together and culture and art are highly developed. 37 mosques, 14 small mosques, 4 Dervish Lodges, 8 madrasahs, 4 churches, 1 synagogue, 31 fountains, 5 Turkish baths, 40 coffee houses, 5 pharmacies and 5 drinking houses that were present in the city at the end of the 19th century give information about the social and cultural structure here. Poetry, music and handicrafts and especially architecture was developed. 

Kilis was part of the Aleppo Vilayet of the Ottoman Empire until the First World War, after which it passed to the Republic of Turkey. There was also an Armenian and Jewish community. The sizable Armenian population was persecuted and eventually massacred during the Armenian Genocide.

Being a border town, Kilis has long had a reputation for smuggling and drug trafficking. Although this has apparently been reduced, even today cigarettes, spirits and cheap electrical items can be bought for cash at low prices. During the Syrian Civil War, the city became a target of continuous rocket attacks by ISIL. in April 2016, the town was struck by rockets fired by ISIS killing 21 people and injuring others.
Öncüpınar Accommodation Facility is near the town.

Demographics
Zakariya al-Qazwini mentioned Kilis as a Turkic village in Athar al-Bilad. In his magazine from 1844, William Harrison Ainsworth included Kilis as a settlement of 12 thousand people, mostly composed of Turkomans and some Armenians, Kurds, and Osmanlis. In 1850, Francis Rawdon Chesney mentioned that Kilis was chiefly inhabited by Turkomans, who were agriculturists and carriers, and also Armenians, Turks, and Kurds, totaling to 12 thousand people. In 1869, American missionaries noted that the prevalent language in Kilis was Turkish unlike Aleppo, while Arabic was mostly spoken by the Greeks of the town, who also understood Turkish but didn't prefer the language. In Encyclopædia Britannica Eleventh Edition from 1911, Kilis was included as a town of 20 thousand inhabitants, mainly composed of Circassians, Turkomans, and Arabs. In 1914, the kaza of Kilis consisted of 78,905 Muslims, 434 Greeks, 3,934 Armenians, 775 Jews, 376 Armenian Catholics, and 390 Protestants.

Geography
Kilis is surrounded by three important cities, Gaziantep, Antakya, and Aleppo, and located at the crossroads of Anatolia and Syria. As a result of its proximity to the Mediterranean Sea, it is located in a region where the climate transitions from a Mediterranean to a continental character. It is also located on the Fertile Crescent, which has been home to settlements since the very beginning of history. 

Indeed, until 1996 Kilis was a district of Gaziantep Province, being made into a province by Tansu Çiller following an open vote-winning gambit in the 1995 general election.

Architecture
The city in which traditional stone architecture is dominant, has an organic structure. Narrow streets, stone walls and houses with courtyards inside create the structure of the city together with the monumental buildings. The houses of Kilis are shaped depending on the effects of the climate and cultural approaches and are not easily detected from outside as they are surrounded with high walls. You can see the houses as places located around large courtyards when you enter through the door that opens to the street or dead-end street.

Cuisine
The local kebab known as Kilis Tava is renowned, and also the breads, baklava, künefe and stuffed vegetables.

Education 
Kilis 7 Aralık University is located in Kilis and has around 8,000 undergraduate and graduate students.

Places of interest
Sights in the town include  a number of Ottoman era mosques and stone houses with courtyards and elaborate carved wooden fittings.

Mosques
Canbolat or Tekke, built in the 16th century.
Muallak, built in the 16th century. 
Hacı Derviş, built in 1551.
Şeyhler or Şeyh Süleyman, built in 1655.
Hindioğlu, built in 1664.
Akcurun, built in the 16th or 17th century.
Şeyh, built in 1569.
Şeyh Hilal, the minaret was built in 1641.
Katrancı or Alacalı, the present structure was rebuilt in 1962.
Murtaza, built in 1659 repaired in 1948.
Cüneyne, built in 1569.

Mausoleums (Türbe)
The Mausoleum of Sheikh Mansur 
The Mausoleum of Sheikh Muhammed Bedevi (Rıttali) 
The Mausoleum of Sheikh Muhammed Ensari

Dervish Lodges (Tekke)
Shurahbil bin Hasanah Dervish Lodge and Mausoleum

Turkish Baths (Hamam)
Old (Eski) Baths
Paşa Baths
Tuğlu (Daltaban Pasha) Baths

Climate
Kilis has a hot summer Mediterranean climate (Köppen climate classification Csa), with very hot, dry and long summers and cool and rainy winters, with occasional snowfall.

References

External links 

 Kilis Police Department 

 
Jewish communities in Turkey